DZBB-TV (channel 7) is a television station in Metro Manila, Philippines, serving as the flagship of the GMA network. It is owned and operated by the network's namesake corporate parent alongside GTV flagship DWDB-TV (channel 27). Both stations share studios at the GMA Network Center, EDSA corner Timog Avenue, Diliman, Quezon City, while DZBB-TV's hybrid analog and digital transmitting facility is located at the GMA Tower of Power, Tandang Sora Avenue, Barangay Culiat, Quezon City (sharing facilities with sister stations GTV 27 and Barangay LS 97.1).

History
DZBB-TV traces its history to Metro Manila radio station DZBB, owned by Loreto F. de Hemedes, Inc., later renamed Republic Broadcasting System, Inc. of Robert "Uncle Bob" Stewart. After the success of its radio station, the company ventured into television. On October 29, 1961, RBS Channel 7, the fifth television station in the Philippines (after ABS Channel 3 and CBN Channel 9, which were owned by ABS-CBN Corporation which now owns Channel 2 in Manila, IBC Channel 13 by the (Inter-Island Broadcasting Corporation), and ABC Channel 5 by the (Associated Broadcasting Corporation). The television network started its operations with just 25 employees (other stations had 200), a surplus transmitter, two old cameras and no lighting equipment and props.

The station was always in the red and Stewart was about to give up, when the program "Dancetime with Chito" suddenly became an instant hit and advertising revenues started to pour in. Canned programs from the United States further sustained its success.

In 1972, President Ferdinand Marcos declared martial law in the Philippines and the station was forced to shut down, though it only lasted for more than 3 months, and returned on the air in late-December of that year; the station was blocktimed by the National Media Production Center (NMPC) with limited three-month permits. In 1974, RBS, including its TV and radio stations, were sold to a triumvirate composed of Felipe Gozon, Gilberto Duavit Sr., and Menardo Jimenez who introduced a programming concept catering to the new audience. The new management acquired new equipment and introduced new programs and a new name, GMA (Greater Manila Area) Radio-Television Arts with its new identity, "Where You Belong" in 1978.

In 1983, DZBB-TV broadcast the funeral of Senator Ninoy Aquino. At that time, it was a small item due to immediate censorship. But, the station bravely broadcast the coverage with a limit of 10 seconds on free TV. In response, President Ferdinand Marcos issued a warning to the station or else they will share the same fate of other networks, especially ABS-CBN.

When democracy in the Philippines was restored in the People Power Revolution in 1986, other television stations began to air, some with their original owners. The political instability of the country also added to the station's burden, when soldiers stormed into its studios for two days in a part of coup attempt to topple then President Corazon Aquino.

In July 1987, GMA introduced its new dimension in television broadcasting as the network was transmitted in full stereo, dubbed as GMA StereoVision, and became the first Philippine TV station to broadcast programs in full stereo until 1998 when it switched to the current 120 kilowatt capacity.

On November 7, 1988, DZBB officially inaugurated a new 100,000 watt transmitter in Quezon City. Known as the "Tower of Power", which initially operated on a 50 kilowatt transmitting output from 1988 to 1998, the  transmitter helped improve the channel's reception in Luzon, and was also the tallest man-made structure in the country at the time.

Digital television

Digital channels

DZBB-TV's digital signal operates on UHF channel 15 (479.143 MHz) and broadcasts on the following subchannels:

In February 2013, GMA Network conduct a digital test broadcast with the ISDB-T standard via its UHF channel 27 (551.143 MHz) frequency.

According to a December 2017 press release, the station's upgraded signal transmission covered the areas of Metro Manila, Rizal, Cavite, Laguna, Bulacan and parts of Pampanga, Bataan, Nueva Ecija and Batangas.

In 2018, National Telecommunications Commission released implementing rules and regulations on the re-allocation of the UHF Channels 14-20 (470–512 Megahertz (MHz) band) for digital terrestrial television broadcasting (DTTB) service. All operating and duly authorized Mega Manila VHF (very high frequency) television networks are entitled to a channel assignment from Channels 14 to 20.

In 2019, the NTC, through a memorandum circular, authorized GMA to operate UHF channel 15 (479.143 MHz) as its secondary channel to expand the usage of channels 14-20 for digital TV broadcasts. Following ZOE Broadcasting Network's decision not to renew its joint venture (GMA News TV) with GMA after June 2019, and a subsequent planned reactivation of DWDB-TV's analog signal for the rest of the GNTV's analog broadcast run, third-party sources reported that the station's digital signal will move to the assigned channel 15 frequency after channel 11's blocktime deal with GMA expires.

On May 15, 2019, GMA Network began to transmit its digital test broadcast on UHF Channel 15 (479.143 MHz) as its permanent frequency assigned by National Telecommunications Commission.

Areas of coverage

Primary areas 
 Metro Manila 
 Cavite
 Bulacan
 Laguna
 Rizal

Secondary areas 
 Pampanga
 Portion of Nueva Ecija
 Portion of Tarlac
 Portion of Zambales
 Portion of Bataan
 Portion of Batangas

References

See also
GMA Network
GTV
List of GMA Network stations
Barangay LS 97.1
Super Radyo DZBB 594

Television stations in Metro Manila
Television channels and stations established in 1961
GMA Network stations
Digital television stations in the Philippines